Ribbed mussel is a common name of:
Aulacomya atra, a southern hemisphere mussel species
Geukensia demissa, a North American mussel species

Animal common name disambiguation pages